The Criminal Procedure Law of the People's Republic of China is a procedural statute of China intended to ensure the correct implementation of Chinese criminal law. It defines how trials are to be conducted, what rights suspects of crimes have to defend themselves, the role and scope of the activities of defense lawyers, and the entire process of the administration of justice through the courts in China.

The statute has been criticized as offering inadequate protections for those suspected of crimes by the Ministry of Public Security. Lawyers have called for it to be amended to demand that criminal defense lawyers be present during interrogations by police, as well as video and audio recordings being made mandatory. Both these measures would prevent the torture and other abuse in custody widely employed to gain confessions.

The statute is also often not enforced, and ignoring it rarely results in penalties administered by the procuratorate or other supervisory organs. There are multiple documented cases of the procuratorate and public security bureau ignoring it and instead taking direction from the political-legal committees at various levels.

The controversial Hong Kong national security law provides for application of the Criminal Procedure Law in cases handled by the Office for Safeguarding National Security of the CPG in the HKSAR in Hong Kong.

References 

Law of the People's Republic of China
Codes of criminal procedure